Cercoptera banonii is a species of beetle in the family Cerambycidae. It was described by Spinola in 1839.

References

Trachyderini
Beetles described in 1839